Sesostris may refer to:

 Sesostris, a king of Egypt described by Herodotus
 Senusret, three kings of the 12th Dynasty also called Sesostris
 Sesostris (play), a 1728 play by John Sturmy
 Sesostris Bank, a submerged bank named after the 1839 steam frigate  of the Indian Navy.
 Sesostris Reef, a previous name for Margaret Brock Reef, a reef in South Australia
 Sesostris rock – a submerged rock that in the 19th Century lay near what was then the entrance to the Yong River (Guangxi)
  – one of several ships
 Ampeloglypter sesostris, a species of weevil
 Parides sesostris, a species of butterfly